The United States national rugby sevens team had its best season to date in the Sevens World Series during the 2014–15 season under head coach Mike Friday. The U.S. finished sixth in the series.

The team capped off the season by going 6–0 to win the 2015 London Sevens, the first time the U.S. has won a World Series tournament.

2014–15 World Series

2015 London Sevens 
The U.S. won the 2015 London Sevens, their first ever tournament win in the World Series. The U.S. defeated Australia 45-22 in the final, with Danny Barrett and Maka Unufe each scoring two tries. Danny Barrett and Madison Hughes were named to the tournament’s seven-man Dream Team. Hughes scored seven tries throughout the tournament, tied for first in tries scored. Perry Baker scores six tries, tied for fourth overall.

2014–15 leading scorers 

Tries
 Carlin Isles (32)
 Perry Baker (28)
 Madison Hughes (24)
 Zack Test (23)
 Maka Unufe (22)
 Danny Barrett (18)

Points
 Madison Hughes (296)
 Carlin Isles (160)
 Perry Baker (140)
 Zack Test (115)
 Maka Unufe (110)

Updated: May 17, 2015

Olympic qualifying 

Rugby returned to the Summer Olympics at the 2016 Olympics in Rio de Janeiro, where the United States attempted to defend its title. The U.S. defeated Canada 21–5 in the final of the 2015 NACRA Men's Sevens Championships to qualify for the 2016 Olympics.

Pool A

Semifinals

2015 Pan Am Games

Group A

Medal round

Quarterfinals

Semifinals

Bronze medal match

References

2014-15
United States
2014 in American rugby union
2015 in American rugby union